3DD Productions is a UK-based television production company with international licensing done in-house by its sister company 3DD Entertainment, together forming the 3DD Group. 3DD Productions specialises in documentaries on stars of film, television and music as well as history and factual genres, with notable presenters and drama recreation. The biopics cover royalty, crime, history, biography, lost art and mythology. Key UK and international broadcaster partners include Sky Arts, Yesterday UKTV, Sky Arte, RAI, Foxtel, AXS TV, Netflix, Ovation, ZDF,  TF1, and AMC/Sundance. 
Long running culture and arts series include Discovering Film and Discovering Music, known internationally as Stars of the Silver Screen, and Rock Legends and Movie Talk, Pop Profiles, London Live, all entering 5th seasons or more, with other factual entertainment series such as Passion for Fashion -The Designers.
Notable history series include Murder Maps, "Tale of Two Sisters",  The Stuarts, A Bloody Reign, Murder on the Railway, Raiders of the Lost Art, Myths & Monsters, The Vietnam War, Hitler – Germany's Fatal Attraction.

3DD Productions have single documentaries around key anniversaries, such as  Hitler's Olympics the 80th anniversary of the Berlin Olympics,a 3 part collection covering The Kennedys', Martin Luther King and the Russian Revolution.

Television

Productions 
 Shakespeare-The Legacy To the world, Shakespeare left a lasting legacy and an awful lot of unanswered questions. Follow John Nettles as he recounts the life of William Shakespeare. He will investigate the Lost Years; discover the Language used in his plays; examine 'The Doubters' and see what Shakespeare's lasting influence has been in our modern world. This programme will delve into the mysteries and bring together all the fascinating facts about The Bard.
 Movie Talk Series 4 & 5 : Movie Talk show hosted by Jason Solomons guests include Timothy Spall, Eddie Marsan, John Madden, Nick Broomfield, Olga Kurylenko, Michael Winterbottom, Alfred Molina, Carey Mulligan, Paul Bettany, Marion Cotillard, Aidan Gillen, Alicia Vikander, Rupert Everett, Romain Duris, Jonathan Pryce, Celine Sciamma, Jenny Agutter, Sir Alan Parker, David Koepp, Andrea Riseborough and many more.
 Raiders of the Lost Art Series 2. A new series entering the mysterious world of art theft, how these heists took place and how some pieces were recovered. Episodes include The Scream, Portrait of Adele, Lady with an Ermine, Self Portraits, Opening of the Fifth Seal, Impression, Sunrise, Il Spasimo, Ghent Altarpiece, Light and Color, The Sunflowers, Girl With a Pearl Earring and The Boy in the Red Vest.
 Discovering Fashion The Designers – This new series looks at the highlights and impact of some the world's greatest, and influential designers of the 20th Century. Featuring contributions from the UK's leading fashion writers and journalists we find out the stories behind these characters who laid the foundation for modern fashion we experience today. Featuring Givenchy, Yves Saint Laurent, Dior, Chanel, Tom Ford & Valentino.
 Hitler Germanys's Fatal Attraction At the turn of the 20th Century Europe is in a state of flux, the perfect conditions for the formation of the most terrifying political organisation history has seen, the Nazi's. How was the country of Germany seduced by them? Was a whole nation under the spell of the Nazi Party or did the hope of a better life quickly turn sour once the killing began? All these questions are answered as we track the birth, rise and ultimate demise of Hitler and the Nazi Party. This new series features interviews with Captain Eric "Winkle" Brown and Fritz Lustig. Both were in Berlin in the 1930s and both had to flee during the last moments.
 Anne Frank A Tale of Two Sisters This new compelling one-hour film explores the extraordinary tale of Anne Frank and Eva Schloss. Eva, who met Anne in Amsterdam in 1938, survived Auschwitz and was to become involved in one of the world's most extraordinary books. Eva talks about her memories of Anne Frank, her survival from the war and the death camps, and how she was to become the step daughter of Anne's Father, Otto Frank.
 Murder Maps This brand new crime history series takes you back to some of the most grisly murder cases in London's past. Our presenter, Nicholas Day''', guides us into the world of these killers as we see the murders unfold and the police ingenuity and early forensics help bring them to justice. Featuring forensic experts and historians, archive and dramatic re-construction to reveal shocking tales from London's dark side
 The Vietnam War The compelling story of the Vietnam War. The dynastic history, the impact of Christian missionaries & French colonialism, Japan's invasion & the rise of Ho Chi Minh. How the USA's fear of communism started a sequence of events that led to an escalation from 20,000 advisers in 1964 to 500,000 troops in 1968. By 1973 Nixon had resigned and America was forced to withdraw from Saigon on 30 April 1975. This new series includes interviews with war correspondents, Michael Nicholson (ITN), Bob Simon (CBS), writer Jon Swain and Vietnamese Journalist Anh Tu Nguyen, who fled in 1975 seeking asylum in the UK.
 Heels to Hiking Boots – in Pre-Production Hannah & Hasan tell us how to experience the world, as they travel on the spur of the moment, discover the hidden gems, the real people and their stories, the cultures and traditions, and of course the exotic locations and delicious food... all on a shoestring budget! This brand new series is the guide to the world for those inspired by Bourdain, disillusioned with the inclusive packaged holiday, and hungry for their own real life travel experience.

Previous television productions

 360 Sessions: 26 Part Series on musicians from around the world for Channel 4 and MTVHD. Featuring Snoop Dogg, 50 Cent, Stereophonics, Mark Ronson, Linkin Park, My Chemical Romance, and most recently The Shins. Filmed in London, New York, Las Vegas, Miami, Portland and Los Angeles. Series 4 in Pre-production
 Discovering: a continuing series for Sundance Channel Global and Sky Arts, delving into major figures of artistic significance. Film maker Lyndy Saville meets film director, Franco Zeffirelli looks at the political and musical legacy of John Lennon, and discovers the Shakespeare character Hamlet through encounters with Christopher Plummer, David Tennant and John Nettles and recently completed programmes about John Huston and Luis Buñuel
 Stars of the Silver Screen: Series 1 & 2 for BIO HD UK. Featured stars include Marilyn Monroe, Elizabeth Taylor, Marlon Brando, Frank Sinatra, Audrey Hepburn, Sophia Loren, Gene Kelly, Rita Hayworth and Kirk Douglas.
 In Conversation...: Series 1 & 2 interviews with some of Britain's leading actors (Sir Ben Kingsley, John Hurt, Tom Courtenay) and directors (Terry Gilliam, Stephen Frears, Mike Newell, Ken Loach). With Evening Standard film critic Derek Malcolm.KOKO Pop Series 1 – 4 2010–2012 Channel 4 Series featuring interviews and performances Justin Bieber, Jessie J, Alexandra Burke, Nicole Scherzinger, One Direction, Tinie Tempah, Paloma Faith, N-Dubz, Chipmunk, Example (rapper), Professor Green, Marina and the Diamonds, Lady Gaga, Selena Gomez, The Saturdays, Taio Cruz, LMFAO, Rizzle Kicks, Labrinth, Will Young, Demi Lovato, The Wanted, Wretch 32, Usher (singer), Emeli Sande, Cher Lloyd.
 Discovering Music / Rock Legends Series 1 12 part series David Bowie, Elton John, Eric Clapton, Green Day, Johnny Cash, Neil Diamond, Paul Simon, Pink Floyd, Rod Stewart, Tom Petty, Queen and Velvet Underground
 Pinter's Progress – Harold Pinter Directed by BAFTA winning Philip Saville 2009
 Movie Stars Series 1 Featuring Robert Downey Jr., Keira Knightley, Leonardo DiCaprio, Kristen Stewart, Kirsten Dunst, Tom Cruise, Angelina Jolie, Will Smith, Brad Pitt, Matthew McConaughey, Johnny Depp and Natalie Portman
 Pop Profiles Series 1Beyoncé, Usher, Lily Allen, Rihanna, 50 Cent, Kanye West, Mariah Carey, Justin Timberlake, Katy Perry, Lady Gaga, Pink, Eminem, Britney Spears and Snoop Dogg
 Pop Profiles Series 2David Guetta, Jennifer Lopez, Jay Z, Tupac Shakur, Adele, No Doubt, Foo Fighters, Coldplay, Ke$ha, Drake, Nicki Minaj, Lil Wayne, Cee Lo Green, Black Eyed Peas and Christina Aguilera
 Pop Profiles Series 3Justin Bieber, One Direction, Whitney Houston, Taylor Swift, Michael Jackson, T.I., Kelly Clarkson, Bruno Mars, Flo Rida and Maroon 5
 
 London LiveLondon Live Series One (2006)
 London Live Series Two (2007)
 London Live Series Three (2008)
 London Live Series Four (2008)
 London Live Series Five (2009)

London Live Specials
 Primal Scream
 The Killers
 Beck
 Jamiroquai
 Kanye West
 David Gray
 Akon
 Keane
 Lily Allen
 Lady Gaga
 Kelly Clarkson
 Stereophonics

London Live Series Six (2010)
 CeeLo Green
 Mika
 The Courteeners
 JLS
 Kate Nash
 Scouting For Girls
 Ellie Goulding
 Sophie Ellis-Bextor
 Usher
 Kelis
 Katy Perry
 The Pretty Reckless
 N.E.R.D
 Klaxons
 The Script
 The Hoosiers
 MGMT
 Mark Ronson
 Nadine
 Amy Winehouse
 Ellie Goulding

London Live Series Seven (2011)
 Diddy Dirty Money
 Jennifer Hudson
 Chipmunk (rapper)
 Jessie J
 Elbow (band)
 The View (band)
 Miles Kane
 Hard Fi
 Kasabian
 Matt Cardle
 Pixie Lott
 The Saturdays
 Olly Murs
 Foster The People
 JLS

London Live Series Eight (2012)
 Ladyhawke
 Cheryl Cole
 Justin Bieber
 The Killers
 Ne-Yo
 Carly Rae Jepsen
 Rita Ora
 Nelly Furtado
 Emeli Sande
 Angel

London Live Series Nine (2013)
 ASAP Rocky
 Bullet for My Valentine
 Mindless Behavior
 Amelia Lily
 Misha B
 Bastille
 Wretch 32
 Lawson
 Jason Derulo
 2 Chainz
 Jake Bugg
 Backstreet Boys
 Video Killed the Radio Star The Directors View. 6 part series for VH1 USA and Sky Arts 2009
 The Album Chart Show  Series 1–5 (2006–present) for Channel 4 75 episodes.
 Jean-Luc Cinema Godard 2009
 Looking for Truffaut 2009
 Cannes Moments 3 part series 2009 Cinémoi and ITN Source
 Brigitte Bardot – The Icon of France  2009
 Video Killed The Radio Star The Artists View 24 part series featuring AC/DC, Bob Geldof, Duran Duran, Spandau Ballet, Sting, U2, A-Ha, Bon Jovi, Bryan Adams, Fleetwood Mac, Guns N' Roses, Metallica, Def Leppard, Fatboy Slim, Kim Wilde, Megadeth, Olivia Newton-John, Queen, Whitney Houston, Moody Blues, Van Halen, Skid Row, T'Pau and Judas Priest
 Video Killed The Radio Star Specials 3 × 1 hour specials The Music Video's That Shaped The 80's, Rock & Metal Alchemy and Diva's & Directors
 Rufus Wainwright sings Judy Garland Filmed at the London Palladium 2006
 The Agatha Christie Code 1 x 60 for ITV 2006
   The Prince's Trust Rock Gala in 3D'' – filmed from the Royal Albert Hall in November 2010

Corporate and Sales
3DD Productions is independently owned and is part of the 3DD Group formed in 1994. The Group CEO is Dominic Saville, son of British film and television director Philip Saville. 3DD Entertainment is the group's international sales company that represents 3DD Productions.

References

External links
3DD official website

Television production companies of the United Kingdom